2014 State Basketball League season may refer to:

2014 MSBL season, Men's SBL season
2014 WSBL season, Women's SBL season